Cumbernauld North is one of the twenty-one wards used to elect members of the North Lanarkshire Council. It elects four Councillors and covers the northern parts of Cumbernauld lying north-west of the M80 motorway (Balloch/Eastfield, Blackwood, Carrickstone, Craigmarloch, Smithstone, Westerwood and Westfield) plus the separate older villages of Castlecary and Dullatur. Created in 2007, its boundaries remained unchanged in a 2017 review. In 2019, the population was 17,927.

Councillors

Election Results

2017 Election

2012 Election

2007 Election

References

Wards of North Lanarkshire
Cumbernauld